The West of Scotland Football League (WoSFL) is a senior football league based in the west of Scotland. The league sits at levels 6–10 on the Scottish football league system, acting as a feeder to the Lowland Football League.

Founded in 2020, it is currently composed of 79 member clubs competing in five divisions. Geographically, the league covers Argyll & Bute, Ayrshire, East Dunbartonshire, West Dunbartonshire, Glasgow, Inverclyde, Lanarkshire, East Renfrewshire and Renfrewshire. Two clubs are also based in Dumfries and Galloway.

Since its formation it has featured in the senior pyramid system. The winners take part in an end of season promotion play-off with the East of Scotland Football League and South of Scotland Football League champions, subject to clubs meeting the required licensing criteria.

History
On 14 April 2020, the Lowland League announced it had approved 67 applications to join the new league, which included all 63 clubs from the Scottish Junior Football Association's West Region, and four others: Glasgow amateurs Drumchapel United and Glasgow University, Kilmarnock side Bonnyton Thistle moving sideways from the South of Scotland League and Newton Mearns-based youth club St Cadoc's Youth Club from the Paisley, Johnstone & District League.

Initial plans for the inaugural season would have seen the league operate a conference format in order to facilitate all 67 clubs at the same level. However, following a video conference with the Scottish Football Association, the league was split into a top tier and lower divisions, similar to that utilised by the East of Scotland Football League.

On 1 May 2020, the League confirmed that a top division of 20 teams would contest the first season in 2020–21, comprising the 16 teams who had played in the 2019–20 West Region Premiership, the top three placed from the West Championship and one moving 'sideways' from the South of Scotland Football League. This ran contrary to some clubs' expectations that the inaugural campaign would not use a hierarchical system, but the league stated "that option was not on the table" due to legal issues. Teams below the top division would be distributed into three balanced conferences; the list for which was published three days later.

On 17 September 2020, the League announced that the Premier Division would be split into two groups based on the Points Per Game formula that was used to declare the league winners of the SJFA West Region. There would be two phases to the season. In Phase 1, teams would play other teams within their group twice, home and away. Phase 2 consisted of a further ten games, five home and five away, with teams being drawn against teams from the other group. However, the league reverted to a normal home and away format following a number of withdrawals from the initial season.

On 11 January 2021 the league was suspended by the Scottish Football Association due to the escalating COVID-19 pandemic situation. 

On 12 May 2021, the league announced the formation of the Development League, with nine teams becoming initial members. The Development League became Division 4 when the WOSFL changed to a linear structure for the 2022–23 season. Teams in the Development League will only be promoted if they meet specified ground criteria.

Member clubs
After running with a Premier Division of 20 clubs and three Tier 7 Conferences of 15 or 16 clubs during its transitional 2021–22 season, the WoSFL has since switched to a linear structure with the Premier, First, and Second Divisions each containing 16 teams. The Third Division features 19 clubs and the Fourth Division, made up of new members and development league teams, has 12 clubs.

Listed below are the 79 clubs in the WoSFL for the 2022–23 season.

Premier Division
Arthurlie
Auchinleck Talbot
Beith Juniors
Cambuslang Rangers
Clydebank
Cumnock Juniors
Darvel
Glenafton Athletic
Hurlford United
Irvine Meadow XI
Kilwinning Rangers
Kirkintilloch Rob Roy
Largs Thistle
Petershill
Pollok
Troon

First Division
Benburb
Blantyre Victoria
Bonnyton Thistle
Cumbernauld United 
Drumchapel United
Gartcairn
Johnstone Burgh
Kilbirnie Ladeside
Neilston
Rossvale
Rutherglen Glencairn
Shotts Bon Accord
St Cadoc's
St Roch's
Thorniewood United
Whitletts Victoria

Second Division
Ardeer Thistle
Ashfield
Craigmark Burntonians
Forth Wanderers
Glasgow Perthshire
Glasgow United
Glasgow University
Greenock Juniors
Kilsyth Rangers
Maryhill
Maybole Juniors
Muirkirk Juniors
Renfrew
St Anthony's
Wishaw
Yoker Athletic

Third Division
Ardrossan Winton Rovers
Bellshill Athletic
Carluke Rovers
Dalry Thistle
East Kilbride Thistle
Finnart
Girvan
Irvine Victoria
Kello Rovers
Lanark United
Larkhall Thistle
Lesmahagow
Lugar Boswell Thistle
Newmains United
Port Glasgow
Royal Albert
Saltcoats Victoria
Vale of Clyde
Vale of Leven

Fourth Division
 BSC Glasgow
 Campbeltown Pupils
 Easterhouse Academy
 Eglinton
 Glenvale
 Harmony Row
 Kilsyth Athletic
 Rossvale Academy
 St. Peter's
 Thorn Athletic
 Threave Rovers
 West Park United

Seasons

Cup competitions 

 Scottish Cup: For full SFA members and Premier Division winners, who all enter at the preliminary round stage. Knock-out tournament, with no replays from the first round onwards.
 SFA South Region Challenge Cup: This competition was introduced in 2007–08 as a replacement for the Scottish Qualifying Cup (South) which was abolished under the new Scottish Cup format. It is for all senior non-league clubs in the south of Scotland and has 165 entrants for the 2022–23 season - 16 from the Lowland League, 58 from the EoSFL, 12 from the SoSFL, and 79 from the WoSFL. Reserve teams do not take part. The first and second rounds are regionalised, otherwise it is a straight knock-out tournament, without replays.
Strathclyde Cup (sponsored by Strathclyde Demolition): Competition for the 18 WoSFL clubs who are neither SFA nor SJFA members, usually played on the same weekends as Junior Cup matches. Straight knock-out tournament, without replays. The winner goes on to play in the East, South and West of Scotland Cup-Winners Shield against the East's Alex Jack Cup winner and the Southern Counties FA's Alba Cup winners for a place in the following season's Scottish Cup.
West of Scotland League Cup (sponsored by The Kilmarnock Pie): All 79 WoSFL sides compete in this straight knock-out tournament without replays.
Scottish Junior Cup (sponsored by Macron): Competition for the 53 WoSFL clubs who remain members of the SJFA after moving from the Junior leagues. Knock-out tournament without replays, drawn matches go straight to a penalty shootout, two legged semi-finals.

Holders
2021–22 winners unless stated.
South Region Challenge Cup: Auchinleck Talbot
West of Scotland League Cup: Hurlford United
Strathclyde Cup: Renfrew (2022–23)
Cup Winners Shield: Drumchapel United

Notes

References

External links
 Official website

 
6
Scot
Sports leagues established in 2020
2020 establishments in Scotland
Football in Dumfries and Galloway
Football in East Ayrshire
Football in East Dunbartonshire
Football in East Renfrewshire
Football in Glasgow
Football in Inverclyde
Football in North Ayrshire
Football in North Lanarkshire
Football in Renfrewshire
Football in South Ayrshire
Football in South Lanarkshire
Football in West Dunbartonshire